Hajj Qalandar (also Romanized as Ḩājj Qalandar; also known as Ḩājjī Qalandar and Posht Kūh) is a village in Babuyi Rural District, Basht District, Basht County, Kohgiluyeh and Boyer-Ahmad Province, Iran. At the 2006 census, its population was 80, in 21 families.

References 

Populated places in Basht County